Timothy Paul O'Malley (born 21 August 1994) is a New Zealand rugby union player. His position of choice is first five-eighth.

Career
Originally from the small Central Otago town of Paerau, O'Malley attended boarding school at St Kevin's College and later played for Heartland Championship side North Otago in 2012. 

He spent three years playing for the  Academy before moving to Picton at the start of 2016, taking up a job as a rugby development officer for his local club Waitohi as well as playing for the club. 

He was part of the Tasman team that won the Mitre 10 Cup for the first time in 2019. 

In 2019, O'Malley played for the Utah Warriors in Major League Rugby (MLR), where he was the team's leading scorer. He also had a stint with the NEC Green Rockets. 

He signed with the Dallas Jackals for the 2021 Major League Rugby season; however, it was later announced that the side would not be making their debut season in the competition until 2022. O'Malley was again part of the Mako side that won the 2020 Mitre 10 Cup. 

In May 2021, O'Malley was called into the  squad as an injury replacement for the Super Rugby Trans-Tasman competition.

In September 2021, O'Malley canceled his contract with the Dallas Jackals and signed with Italian side Zebre. He played for Italian team in 2021–22 United Rugby Championship season.

References

1994 births
Living people
Green Rockets Tokatsu players
Highlanders (rugby union) players
St Kevin's College
Rugby union centres
Rugby union fly-halves
Rugby union players from Otago
Tasman rugby union players
Utah Warriors players
Zebre Parma players